MFS may refer to:

Education 
Miletich Fighting Systems, a mixed martial arts training camp founded by Pat Miletich
Moorestown Friends School, a private Quaker school located in Moorestown, New Jersey
Moscow Finnish School, a Finnish private school in Russia

Politics and religion 
Maryknoll Fathers' School, a government-funded co-ed in Hong Kong SAR, P.R.C.
Master of Forensic Sciences, a specialized professional degree
Meeting for Sufferings, a consultative body in Britain Yearly Meeting of the Religious Society of Friends (Quakers)
Metropolitan Fire Service, South Australia's government-funded fire service
Stasi, or Ministry for State Security (Ministerium für Staatssicherheit), the security and intelligence organisation of the German Democratic Republic
Syriac Military Council (ܡܘܬܒܐ ܦܘܠܚܝܐ ܣܘܪܝܝܐ, Mawtbo Fulhoyo Suryoyo)

Technology 
Macintosh File System, disk file system created by Apple Computer for storing files on 400K floppy disks
MINIX file system, the native file system of the Minix operating system
Media FileSystem, the filesystem used by TiVo
Moose File System, an open-source distributed file system
Metropolitan Fiber Systems, a telecommunications service provider acquired by WorldCom in 1997
 Mobile financial services, a term used in Mobile banking
Misfiring system or antilag system, a system used on turbocharged cars to cure turbo lag

Science 
Material Flow System, a term used in material flow analysis, also can be a subsystem in various automated warehouse solutions (example: SAP EWM)
Maximum flooding surface, the surface that marks the transition from a transgression to a regression
Miller Fisher syndrome, a rare nerve disease, a variant of Guillain–Barré syndrome
Marfan syndrome, a genetic disorder affecting connective tissue
Major Facilitator Superfamily, a family of related proteins involved in active transport of solutes across a membrane

Other 
MFS (label), a former German based trance label
MFS 2000 Inc, a Hungarian ammunition manufacturer located in Sirok
Multi-fuel stove, a type of stove
Microsoft Flight Simulator, an amateur flight simulator series
MFS Investment Management formerly Massachusetts Financial Services.
Missouri Folklore Society, a historical society for Missouri folklore
Octaviar, Australian property group formerly known as MFS